Kim Yool-ho (born February 21, 1985) is a South Korean actor and model, He is best known for his role in The Map Against the World, in which he played Prince Geumwi, and the 2016 zombie thriller apocalypse film Train to Busan in a cameo role in which he helps Yong-suk (played by Kim Eui-sung).

Filmography

Films 
 The Map Against the World as Prince Geumwi (2016)
 Train to Busan as Man in suit 2 (infected) (2016)
 Northern Limit Line as 357 guard (2015)

Dramas 
 Uncle Samshik
 Rookie Cops as Chu Yi-sa (2022)
 Apgujeong Midnight Sun as Assistant Manager Sung (2015)
 Witch's Romance as Dong Ha's senior (cameo) (2014)
 Hotel King as new employee (2014)
 Shining Romance as hit and run man (2013-2014)
 Tasty Life as doctor (2012)

References

External links 
 

1985 births
Living people
South Korean male television actors
South Korean male film actors
21st-century South Korean male actors
People from Cheongju